The 2010–11 VCU Rams men's basketball team represented Virginia Commonwealth University in the Colonial Athletic Association conference during the 2010–11 NCAA Division I men's basketball season. The Rams, led by second year head coach Shaka Smart, played their home games at the Stuart C. Siegel Center. They finished the season 28–12, 12–6 in CAA play and lost in the championship game of the 2011 CAA men's basketball tournament to Old Dominion. They received an at-large bid in the 2011 NCAA Division I men's basketball tournament where they played in the new First Four round, defeating USC.They defeated Georgetown and Purdue in the second and third rounds, respectively, to advance to the Sweet Sixteen. The defeated Florida State to advance to the Elite Eight where they defeated Kansas. They advanced to the school's first ever Final Four, being just the third 11 seed in Tournament history to advance to the Final Four, where they were defeated by Butler. The VCU Rams finished 6th in the ESPN/USA Today Coaches Poll at the end of the season. This was the highest ranking in VCU's history and the highest ranking of any team from the CAA. The 2011 NCAA tournament run by VCU is regarded by some as one of the best Cinderella runs of all time. They are the first men's Division I basketball team that played in the First Four to make it to the Final Four; UCLA made a similar run ten years later. They also join the 2020–21 Bruins as the only teams in the tournament to win five games and not qualify for the national championship game.

Roster

Signees

2010–11 team recruits

Season

Preseason 
VCU was predicted to finish third in the Colonial Athletic Association preseason polls, which was released October 19, 2010 in Arlington, Virginia. Senior guard Joey Rodriguez was selected to the preseason Atlantic 10 Conference first team.

Schedule

|-
!colspan=12 style=| Exhibition

|-
!colspan=12 style=| Regular season
|-

|-
!colspan=12 style=| CAA Tournament

|-
!colspan=12 style=| NCAA tournament
|-

Honors 
Senior forward Jamie Skeen was named the Southwest Regional Most Outstanding Player. Skeen was also named to 2nd team All- Colonial Athletic Association. Senior guard Joey Rodriguez was named to 3rd team  All- Colonial Athletic Association.

References

VCU
VCU Rams men's basketball seasons
VCU
NCAA Division I men's basketball tournament Final Four seasons
VCU Rams
VCU Rams